Kelviyum Naane Bathilum Naane is a 1982 Indian Tamil-language film, directed by N. Murugesh, starring Karthik and Mucherla Aruna. It was released on 7 May 1982.

Plot
Nirmal teaches piano to Usha. Nirmal meets Radha many times and they fall in love with each other. When his student Usha tells him her love, Nirmal says that he is in love with Radha and they will get married soon. Melancholic, she commits suicide.

Later, many people cross Nirmal's path thinking it's Babu. At the marriage ceremony, Satyavati tries to stop thinking it's her son Babu and they all explain it's Nirmal. Few days after the marriage, Nirmal meets an accident and his car burns, the police officers concludes that he's dead.

In actuality, Satyavati was Usha's mother, created the character of Babu and she escrows Nirmal. When Nirmal says the truth to Radha, she thinks that it's Babu. Radha's father tells to Satyavati that Radha is her daughter. Satyavati forgives Nirmal, but he decides to revenge her and Usha, he goes to jail for Nirmal's murder as Babu. Satyavati appoints Rajagopal, a lawyer, to save him. Finally, Nirmal is liberated and Satyavati dies to rejoin her late daughter Usha.

Cast
 Karthik as Nirmal / Babu
 Mucherla Aruna as Radha
 Poornima Devi as Usha
 Srividya as Satyavati
 Jaishankar as Rajagopal (guest appearance)
 Vadivukkarasi as Pankajam (guest appearance)

Soundtrack 
The music was composed by Ilaiyaraaja, with lyrics written by Vaali.

References

External links
 

1982 films
1980s Tamil-language films
Films scored by Ilaiyaraaja